This is an incomplete list of Australian military operations.

See also
Current Australian Defence Force deployments

References

External links
Global Operations: Department of Defence

Australia

Operations